The Stryder was an American band hailing from Long Island, New York, United States. The band was formed by Peter Toh and Scottie Redix in 1999 after their previous project, Yearly, disbanded following the departure of bassist Eben D'amico, who left to join Saves the Day. They added a vocalist and bassist, John Johansen and Nick Wendel respectively. They released a 7" on Elkion Records titled "The Hits Just Keep on Comin" and shortly after signed a deal to Equal Vision Records and released their debut album Masquerade in the Key of Crime in the mid-2000. The band toured extensively and began writing new material in 2001. They added former Glassjaw drummer Durijah Lang, and moved Scottie Redix to guitar and backing vocals. In mid-2001 the band parted ways with vocalist John Johansen. Scottie stated in a 2019 interview that the split from Johansen was amicable and due to the change in creative direction the band was going in. 2002 saw the release of "Jungle City Twitch". Debuting a new sound, The Stryder continued to tour the country in support of the new release. In 2003/2004, Elkion Records released Savor The Danger! which contained a collection of old demos and the two songs from the 7" previously released on the label. Toh released his first solo EP "Cleopatra" in 2004 on Elkion Records. Durijah moved on to become the drummer of Classic Case and in 2007, became Pete Parada's replacement in Saves The Day. In 2006, Toh then went on to start an internet TV/new media company, Hidden Track TV with Adam Schleichkorn, and released a solo EP titled "Shoes of a Beast".

Toh is currently working on his first album, titled Wildlife. Scottie Redix now plays under the moniker 'Cassonova Brown' and is currently working on his first album, with the working title, 'On the Wall', and there are two demos available on Soundcloud.com. Redix is also a member of the musical collective Teachers, who also have an album titled "Anesthesia" slated for an early 2013 release. Teachers contributed to Kanye West's "Monster".

Discography

Albums
Masquerade in the Key of Crime (Equal Vision Records - 2000)
Jungle City Twitch (Equal Vision Records - 2002)

EPs
The Hits Just Keep on Comin'... (Elkion Records - 2000)
Savor the Danger! (Elkion Records - 2002)

References

External links
The Stryder's Home Page
Peter Toh's Home Page
Peter Toh's Myspace Page
Hidden Track TV
September 2019 podcast interview with Scottie Redix

Musical groups from Long Island
Equal Vision Records artists